Jorge Diogenes Fernández-Valdés (born 6 August 1992) is an Argentine professional golfer who currently plays on the Korn Ferry Tour.

Amateur career
Fernández-Valdés had a successful junior career representing Argentina at the 2009 Toyota Junior Golf World Cup in Japan and finishing runner up in the 2010 Callaway Junior World Golf Championships in the 15-17 age category at Torrey Pines Golf Course.

During his amateur career Fernández-Valdés also competed in the 2008 U.S. Junior Amateur and was a two time winner of the Pereyra Iraola Cup in 2008 and 2011 as the low amateur in the Argentine Open.

Professional career
Fernández-Valdés turned professional in 2012 and immediately joined PGA Tour Latinoamérica, making his inaugural start on the tour at the 2012 Roberto De Vicenzo Invitational Copa NEC. During the 2012 season he earned his full playing rights for PGA Tour Latinoamérica at qualifying in Buenos Aires and finished 27th on the Order of Merit.

In 2013, Fernández-Valdés achieved his first career win as a professional at the Mundo Maya Open becoming the youngest ever PGA Tour Latinoamérica champion at 20 years and 9 months old. During 2013 Fernández-Valdés posted a further six top ten finishes on PGA Tour Latinoamérica and finished fourth on the Order of Merit earning him Web.com Tour status for the 2014 season.

During 2013 Fernández-Valdés also made eight appearances on PGA Tour Canada with one top-10 finish.

In 2014 Fernández-Valdés earned his second win on PGA Tour Latinoamérica at the Abierto de Chile. He also finished second at the Mazatlán Open, fifth at the Aberto do Brasil, sixth at the Ecuador Open and tenth at the Colombian Open, ending fifth at the Order of Merit.

Fernández-Valdés played his way to the Web.com Tour through Q School for 2015. He finished second at the Albertsons Boise Open.

Amateur wins
 2008 Pereyra Iraola Cup (as low amateur at the Argentine Open)
 2011 Pereyra Iraola Cup (as low amateur at the Argentine Open)

Professional wins (6)

PGA Tour Latinoamérica wins (4)

TPG Tour wins (1)

Other wins (1)

Results in major championships

CUT = missed the half-way cut

Team appearances
 Eisenhower Trophy (representing Argentina): 2008, 2010
 Toyota Junior Golf World Cup  (representing Argentina): 2009 (winners)

References

External links
 
 
 

Argentine male golfers
PGA Tour Latinoamérica golfers
Golfers from Miami
Sportspeople from Córdoba, Argentina
1992 births
Living people
21st-century Argentine people